The Geely Jiaji is a compact MPV built by Chinese manufacturer Geely as the company's first MPV. The concept named "VF11" was shown at the 2017 Shanghai Auto Show.  The Jiaji provides L2-level automatic driving, intelligence pilot and RCW system.  The Geely Jiaji officially went on sale on March 11, 2019.

Overview 

Geely Jiaji was named VF11 under development. The Jiaji is the first MPV by the Chinese manufacturer. It is based on a Geely-developed CV platform. As the Jiaji officially went on sale on March 11, it proved to be a hit with over 3,000 units sold in its first month.

For the Chinese market, the Geely Jiaji is available with either a 1.5 liter engine with a Plug-In-Hybrid system or a 1.8 liter turbo engine. The  1.5-liter mild hybrid (MHEV) turbo petrol version Jiaji outputs 190 PS and 300 Nm, powering the front wheels via a 7-speed dual-clutch (DCT) automatic transmission.

Jiaji Platinum Edition (2021)

A facelift variant called the Jiaji Platinum Edition was launched in September 2021 featuring redesigned grilles. The Jiaji Platinum Edition is powered by a 1.8-litre Turbo engine producing 183hp（135kW）and 300N·m mated to a 7-speed dual-clutch (DCT) automatic transmission.

Jiaji L (2022-)
From late 2022 or the 2023 model year, the Jiaji received a major makeover called the Jiaji L. The Jiaji L is longer at 4,826 mm, a full 120 mm extra compared to the original Jiaji, and has a slightly lower height of 1,695 mm, 5 mm higher compared to the regular Jiaji while retaining the same width at 1,909 mm and wheelbase of 2,805 mm. For the interior, the Jiaji L also received an updated Galaxy OS infotainment system powered by Geely’s E02 system-on-chip while still retaining a 12.3-inch touchscreen, with the digital instrument cluster upgraded from seven inches to a 10.25-inch unit. The centre console of the Jiaji L features a simpler design with a longer covered storage cubby with a restyled gear lever, an electronic parking brake, and drive mode selector arranged in a single unit located ahead of an elevated arm rest with additional storage under a tilt-up lid. Seating layouts remains to be in 2-2-2 and 2-3-2 configurations. The Jiaji L powertrain is a 1.5-litre turbocharged four-cylinder engine that makes 178 hp (181 PS) at 5,500 rpm and 290 Nm of torque from 2,000 to 3,500 rpm. The engine is paired with a 7-speed wet dual-clutch transmission with front wheel drive across the range. Geely claims a WLTC-rated fuel consumption of 6.9 l/100 km and top speed of 190 km/h.

Technology
The multimedia system provides a 12.3" touchscreen and is able to activate and control all systems in the car. The GKUI infotainment system also includes features such as 360 degree surround view camera, voice command to control windows and sunroof, natural voice recognition and 4G connectivity with online music streaming services. In plug in models, there's also a key which infers users the electric vehicle settings. Some models provides Geely Full LED System. Jiaji also carries three types of power sources.

Petrol models carry a 1.8 L4 turbo engine and a 6-speed automatic gearbox.  There are 4 valves on each cylinder. All models feature optional seating for either 6 or 7 passengers with the 6 seater having 2nd row captain's chairs. Electronic parking brake and electronic gear shifter are standard across the range with the exception of the base 1.5T with 6 speed manual.

Market

Malaysia
PROTON Holdings secured the intellectual properties to the design, development, manufacture, sale, marketing and distribution of the Geely Jiaji alongside the Geely Boyue and Geely Binyue.

Sales

Maple 80V EV 

The Maple 80V EV sold under the Maple and later Livan brand is based on the Geely Jiaji with the exterior body being essentially a rebadge of the Geely MPV. The Maple 80V is Maple’s second model. It is Geely's first product to feature replaceable batteries and can replace batteries at battery swap stations.  In terms of power, the ternary lithium battery pack of the Maple 80V comes from Hefei Guoxuan High-Tech. The motor of the 80V has a rated power of 40kW (54Ps) and a maximum speed of 130km/h.
During the 2020 China International Intelligent Industry Expo, Geely Technology Group released the battery swap stations. Geely announced that it plans to complete 35 battery swap stations in Chongqing in 2020, and more than 200 battery swap stations will be completed in Chongqing by 2023.

References

External links 

 Official website

Jiaji
Compact MPVs
Front-wheel-drive vehicles
Minivans
Cars introduced in 2019
Cars of China